The Financial Sector Union of Sweden is a trade union in Sweden.

Finansförbundet has a membership of 33,000 and represents workers in:
 Banks
 Financial institutions
 Credit brokers
 Mortgage companies
 Stock brokers
 Other companies in the financial sector

Finansförbundet is affiliated with the Swedish Confederation of Professional Employees.

Swedish Confederation of Professional Employees
Finance sector trade unions
Trade unions in Sweden